DT Carnage is a racing game developed by South Korean studio Axis Entertainment. The Nintendo Wii release was cancelled.

Plot
The game revolves around a fictional tournament called the DT Tournament where people race using modified cars and are allowed the use of weapons. The player's father is injured in one of the tournaments, and the player swears revenge against the one who injured him.

Features
Allows the player to use items to slow down opponents
Crush other drivers against the side of the track
RPG mode - use various items and techniques to excel on the track.

References

2008 video games
Agetec games
Multiplayer and single-player video games
PlayStation 2 games
PlayStation Portable games
Racing video games
Video games developed in South Korea
Wii games